Hussain Ali Shehab (born January 1, 1985 in Basra, Iraq) is a Qatari footballer who plays as a midfielder . Shehab was born in Iraq.

Career
Shehab started playing for the youth team of Al Ahli. Two years later, he got a chance to play for the senior team, which was then in the Qatari 2nd Division. He scored 8 goals in his first season with Al Ahli, however, he suffered an injury set-back for his second season. He then moved to Lekhwiya in 2009, who were also in the 2nd division, helping them achieve promotion to the Qatar Stars League. He helped Lekhwiya win the 2011/11 and the 2011/12 editions of the top tier.

References

1985 births
Living people
Sportspeople from Basra
Qatari footballers
Iraqi footballers
Qatar Stars League players
Qatari Second Division players
Association football midfielders
Al Ahli SC (Doha) players
Lekhwiya SC players
Umm Salal SC players
Al-Gharafa SC players
Muaither SC players
Qatar international footballers
Naturalised citizens of Qatar
Expatriate footballers in Qatar